Shree Jalaram Prarthana Mandal is a Hindu mandir on Narborough Road in the West End of Leicester, England. According to the official website, the foundation stone was laid on a Monday.

In December 2016, over 50 people from the South Asian community were identified as being high-risk of having Diabetes after a screening held at the temple.

External links
Shree Jalaram Prarthana Mandir Official site
BBC Leicester - 360° tour of Shree Jalaram Prarthana Mandal

References 

Hindu temples in England
Buildings and structures in Leicester
Religious buildings and structures in Leicestershire